Ennomos magnaria, the maple spanworm moth, notched wing moth, notched-wing geometer or notch-wing moth, is a moth of the family Geometridae. The species was first described by Achille Guenée in 1858. It is found from coast to coast in southern Canada and the northern United States, south in the east to Florida and Louisiana and in the west to California.

The wingspan is 43–60 mm. Adults resemble an autumn leaf. The wings are deeply and unevenly scalloped. They are bright orange yellow and variably spotted with brown and shaded with reddish brown toward the outer margin. Adults are on wing from July to early November in one generation per year.

The larvae feed on the leaves of Alnus, Fraxinus, Tilia, Betula, Ulmus, Carya, Acer, Quercus, and Populus species. They are twig mimics with a green, brown or gray body with white spots. Larvae can be found from May to August. The species overwinters as an egg. Pupation takes place in a cocoon amongst the foliage of their host plant.

References

Moths described in 1857
Moths of North America
Ennomini
Taxa named by Achille Guenée